John Vincent Orlando (born January 24, 2003) is a Canadian singer-songwriter, vlogger, and actor. Orlando first received attention on social media by posting covers of pop songs by artists such as Austin Mahone, Taylor Swift, Rihanna, Justin Bieber, and Shawn Mendes to his YouTube channel. In 2019, Orlando was nominated for the Juno Award for Breakthrough Artist of the Year. He has also won an MTV Europe Music Award for Best Canadian Act four times in 2019, 2020, 2021, and 2022. 
 
Orlando's debut album all the things that could go wrong was released on August 19, 2022.

Early life

Johnny Orlando was born in Mississauga, Ontario, Canada on January 24, 2003. His father, Dale Vincent Orlando, is a lawyer  and his mother, Meredith Orlando, is a housewife. Orlando has three sisters: his eldest sister, Madison, has a YouTube channel on which she occasionally posts about her diet and health routine, the second eldest, Darian, helps Johnny with songwriting and promotion and the youngest, Lauren Orlando is a vlogger, YouTuber, and an aspiring actress.

Career

Darian made a YouTube channel for Johnny, "JohnnyOsings" on December 5, 2011, and posted a cover of him singing "Mistletoe". Orlando and his sister recorded it in their bathroom because their bathroom had good acoustics. Initially, they expected at most 100 views, but to their surprise, the video went viral and got more than 100,000 views in a month. Citing the initial success of the first video, he and his sister continued posting covers of famous musical artists like Justin Bieber, Shawn Mendes, Taylor Swift, Austin Mahone, and Selena Gomez on his YouTube channel while Darian directed, shot, produced and edited all his videos.

His debut EP, VXIIXI was released in 2015 when he was 12 years old. He signed with Universal Music Canada on May 18, 2018, and has released singles such as "Day and Night" and "What If" (both featuring Mackenzie Ziegler), "Last Summer", "Waste My Time", "All These Parties", "Phobias", "See You" and "Everybody Wants You". His second EP, Teenage Fever, was released on March 15, 2019. Orlando embarked on his second headlining North American tour  in support of the EP, beginning on April 29, 2019, in Chicago and ending on May 22, 2019, in Vancouver. It was supported by his close friends Hayden Summerall and Gus McMillan.

It was announced that MTV had signed a deal for consumer products with Orlando at the end of July 2020. On October 23, 2020, he announced his third EP, It's Never Really Over was released.

In 2023, he participated in an all-star recording of Serena Ryder's single "What I Wouldn't Do", which was released as a charity single to benefit Kids Help Phone's Feel Out Loud campaign for youth mental health.

Artistry

Influences
Orlando has cited Justin Bieber and Shawn Mendes among his primary musical inspirations. He is also inspired by Billie Eilish as well as other Canadian artists such as Drake, The Weeknd, Alessia Cara. Orlando has also shared that his dad played Pearl Jam and Otis Redding in the car, which helped cultivate his songwriting skills.

Discography

Albums
All The Things That Could Go Wrong (2022)

EPs
VXIIXI (2015)
Teenage Fever (2019)
It's Never Really Over (2020)

Singles
"Let Go" (2016)
"Day & Night" (with Mackenzie Ziegler) (2016)
"Missing You" (2016)
"Thinking About You" (2017)
"Everything" (2017)
"The Most" (2017)
"What If (I Told You I Like You)" (with Mackenzie Ziegler) (2018) 
"Last Summer" (2018)
"Sleep" (2019)
"Piece of my Heart" (2018)
"All These Parties" (2019)
"Mistletoe" (2019)
"Phobias" (2020)
"See You" (2020)
"Everybody Wants You" (2020)
"Last Christmas" (2020)
"Adelaide" (2020)
"I Don't" (with Dvbbs) (2021)
"Daydream" (2021)
"It's Alright" (2021) 
"You're Just Drunk" (2021)
"How Can It Be Christmas" (2021)
"Someone Will Love You Better"(2022)
"Blur" (2022)
"Fun Out of It" (with BENEE) (2022)
"If He Wanted to He Would" (2022)

Collaborations
"Big Like You" (2017) (Bunyan & Babe soundtracks)
"Christmas Fever" (2017) (with Bars and Melody)
"We Change the World" (2017) (with Raina Harten)
"Keep On Trying" (2018) (with Sylwia PrzyBysz)
"Lean On Me" (2020) (with ArtistsCAN)

Web

Filmography

Awards and nominations

References

External links
 
 

Living people
2003 births
Canadian child singers
Canadian pop singers
Canadian male child actors
Canadian male web series actors
Child pop musicians
Musicians from Mississauga
MTV Europe Music Award winners
Canadian people of Italian descent
Dance-pop musicians